Vice Admiral Russell Willson (December 27, 1883, Fredonia, New York – June 6, 1948, Chevy Chase, Maryland) was a flag officer of the United States Navy and inventor of the Navy Cipher Box (also called 'Naval Cipher Box' or 'Navy Code Box') issued in 1917.

The son of Sidney Louis Willson and Lucy Fenton Staats Willson, Russell Willson attended the Massachusetts Institute of Technology in 1901–1902, before going on to graduate from the United States Naval Academy in 1906.

Career
After graduating from the naval academy, Wilson was commissioned an ensign in 1908. He served in the battleship  during the Vera Cruz Incident at Vera Cruz, Mexico, in 1914 and later as flag lieutenant to Admiral Henry Mayo, who was Commander-in-Chief, United States Atlantic Fleet.

World War I
During World War I, Willson organized and developed the Navy's Code Signal Section in the United States Department of the Navy, for which he was awarded the Navy Cross. He served with the Sixth Battle Squadron of the Royal Navys Grand Fleet at the end of World War I.

Interwar years
Willson commanded destroyers at Greenland in connection with the United States Army's around-the-world flight in 1924. He graduated from the Naval War College in 1924 and was a member of the U.S. Naval Mission to Brazil from 1927 to 1930. He served as naval attache at the United States Embassy in London in 1937 and 1938. Rear Admiral Willson was the last commander of Battleship Division 1 in peacetime prior to the start of World War II.  On 26 May 1939, he relieved Rear Admiral Chester Nimitz as ComBatDiv1, and was relieved on 23 January 1941 by Rear Admiral Isaac Campbell Kidd, who died on the division flagship, in the Japanese attack on Pearl Harbor on 7 December 1941.

World War II
On 1 February 1941, Willson became the superintendent of the United States Naval Academy.  After the start of World War II, Willson, who had served on Admiral Mayo's staff with Ernest J. King became the chief of staff to King in his role as Commander in Chief, U.S. Fleet (COMINCH) on 30 December 1941, Willson, taking office the day that King assumed that command.  In September 1942, Willson was detached for duty with the United States Pacific Fleet, but before he could report to his new assignment was found medically unfit for sea duty. As a result, he retired in January 1943, but was retained in Washington, D.C., for the duration of the war as Deputy Commander-in-Chief, U.S. Fleet. He also served from November 1942 as the naval member of the Joint Strategic Survey Committee for the Joint Chiefs of Staff. Willson was a principal at several of the wartime conferences between Franklin Delano Roosevelt and Winston Churchill.  He was also a member of the U.S. delegation at the Dumbarton Oaks Conference and military advisor at the San Francisco Conference.

After World War II, Willson become associate editor of World Report.

Personal life
An Episcopalian, Russell Willson married Eunice Westcott Willson (1884–1962) on 3 June 1911.  They had a son, Russell, and two daughters, Eunice and Mary.  Lt. Russell Willson, Jr. (1919–1945), USN, was a naval aviator, and Eunice Willson (1912-2011) worked for the Navy for several years as a cryptanalyst.  Russell Willson and his wife, as well as Russell Willson, Jr., are buried together in the United States Naval Academy Cemetery in Annapolis, Maryland.

Decorations

Navy Cross citation
The President of the United States of America takes pleasure in presenting the Navy Cross to Commander Russell Willson, United States Navy, for exceptionally meritorious service in a duty of great responsibility in connection with the preparation, handling, and distribution of war codes and for devising a new and very efficient system of such communications during World War I.

See also

List of Superintendents of the United States Naval Academy

References

Further reading
 Schmidt, Raymond P., "From Code-Making to Policy-Making: Four Decades in the Memorable Career of Russell Willson," Prologue, 48 (Summer 2016), 24–35. 

1883 births
1948 deaths
United States Navy admirals
United States Navy personnel of World War I
United States Navy World War II admirals
Burials at the United States Naval Academy Cemetery
Recipients of the Navy Cross (United States)
Recipients of the Distinguished Service Medal (US Army)
Massachusetts Institute of Technology alumni
United States Naval Academy alumni
Naval War College alumni
Superintendents of the United States Naval Academy
Recipients of the Navy Distinguished Service Medal
People from Fredonia, New York
20th-century American Episcopalians
20th-century American academics